WTME-LD, virtual channel 7 (UHF digital channel 14), branded on-air as TV-7, is a low-power television station licensed to Bruce, Mississippi, United States, which is currently silent. The station is owned by Atlanta-based Gray Television. 

Founded in November 1982 as W07BN, it was the first low-power television station in Mississippi. The station airs locally produced programming including a daily newscast, government meetings, music shows, and high school sports. TV-7 currently covers 10 counties in northeast Mississippi, as well as live streaming on the internet. It is also carried on the MaxxSouth cable system throughout North Mississippi.

Owner Bruce Independent Television, Inc. sold the station in 2020 to 5GTV, LLC. The call letters were changed to WYMP-LD on July 23, 2020.

On October 25, 2021, it was announced that WYMP-LD would be sold to Gray Television for $500,000. The sale was completed on February 23, 2022, making it a sister station to Memphis, Tennessee's NBC affiliate WMC-TV (channel 5). This is despite the fact that Calhoun County (which includes Bruce) lies in the Columbus–Tupelo market, which is not served by a Gray-owned station.

The station changed its call sign to WTME-LD on August 22, 2022.

References

TME-LD
Television channels and stations established in 1983
1983 establishments in Mississippi
Low-power television stations in the United States
Gray Television